The 1981-82 season is Real Sociedad's last league trophy to date. The Basque were capable of defending the title they had won the year before, in a race that went to the last day of the season.

This article shows player statistics and all matches that the club played during the 1981-82 season.

Season summary
In 1981 league champion Real Sociedad took part in the European cup for the first time in its history. The European adventure would however turn to be a disappointment. A single goal was enough for CSKA Sofia to beat the Guipuscoans and advance to the second round.

In the league Real Sociedad started strongly, topping the league until late November, when FC Barcelona took over.
From that moment on the Basque remained close to the top although  rarely first. Real Madrid, Barcelona and Real Sociedad were the top three teams during most of the season.
An away defeat to Hércules in March widened the gap to 5 points from the top. This was interpreted as the end of Real Sociedad's bid for the title. An unlikely succession of events would reverse this situation. FCB only picked 2 points in the last 6 games thanks to which Real Sociedad had a chance of winning the league on the last matchday. The Madrid-Barcelona Derby was disputed on the 33rd matchday. Madrid's victory contributed to Barcelona's catastrophic run.  
Both Madrid and Barcelona failed to win their respective matches on the last matchday while Real Sociedad beat Athletic in the basque derby. 
Thus Real Sociedad won the league for the second time in its history.

The Copa del Rey final was within Real Sociedad's reach too. The semifinals against Real Madrid were resolved with a penalty shootout which the Madrilians won. Prior to this the Guipuscoans had knocked out Valladolid, Athletic Bilbao, Osasuna and Athletic Bilbao B.

Start formations
Starting XI
Lineup that started most of the club's competitive matches throughout the season.

Players

Squad information

Player statistics

Transfers

In

Out

Coaching staff
Alberto Ormaetxea

1981–82 European Cup

First round

La Liga

League table

Matches

é

King's cup

2nd Round

3rd Round

Round of 16

Quarterfinals

Semifinals

References

External links
Squad and stats at bdfutbol.com
All fixtures listed

Real Sociedad seasons
Spanish football clubs 1981–82 season
1981–82